Eugene Carney (1895–1952) was an English professional footballer who played as an outside left in the Football League for New Brighton, Reading and Rochdale.

Personal life 
Carney served as a lance corporal in the King's Regiment (Liverpool) and the Royal Welch Fusiliers during the First World War.

Career statistics

References

1895 births
1952 deaths
Sportspeople from Bootle
English footballers
Association football outside forwards
Everton F.C. players
South Liverpool F.C. (1890s) players
Pontypridd F.C. players
Rochdale A.F.C. players
New Brighton A.F.C. players
Reading F.C. players
English Football League players
British Army personnel of World War I
King's Regiment (Liverpool) soldiers
Royal Welch Fusiliers soldiers
Caernarvon Athletic F.C. players
Sandbach Ramblers F.C. players
Southern Football League players
Military personnel from Merseyside